This is a categorised list of places in the County of Carmarthenshire, Wales.

Administrative divisions

Electoral wards
This is a list of electoral wards:

Communities
This is a complete list of the 72 communities in Carmarthenshire.

Notable places

Principal towns
Ammanford
Burry Port
Carmarthen (county town)
Kidwelly
Llandeilo
Llandovery
Llanelli (largest settlement)
St. Clears
Whitland

See also List of places in Carmarthenshire for an alphabetical list of towns and villages.

Archaeological sites
Carreg Cennen Castle
Dolaucothi Gold Mines
Kidwelly Castle
Laugharne Castle
Llansteffan Castle
Talley Abbey

Parks
Aberglasney Garden
Millennium Coastal Park
National Botanic Garden of Wales
Pembrey Country Park
WWT National Wetlands Centre

Retail Parks
Cross Hands Retail Park
Cross Hands Food Park
Parc Trostre
Pemberton Retail Park

Cultural venues

Museums
Dylan Thomas Boathouse
Kidwelly Industrial Museum
Pendine Museum of Speed

Sporting venues

Stadia
Ffos Las racecourse
Parc y Scarlets sports stadium, Pemberton, home of Scarlets and Llanelli RFC (capacity: 14,340)
Pembrey Race Circuit
Richmond Park sports stadium, Carmarthen (seating: 500)
Stradey Park sports stadium, Llanelli (capacity: 10,800, seatied: 4,649)
Stebonheath Park Multi-Use Sports Stadium, home of Llanelli A.F.C., Llanelli (capacity: 3,700, seated: 700)

Golf courses
Ashburnham Golf Club, Burry Port
Carmarthen Golf Club, Carmarthen
Derllys Court Golf Club, Bancyfelin
Garnant Park Golf Club, Garnant
Glanhir Golf Club, Llandyfan
Glyn Abbey Golf Club, Carway
Machynys Peninsula Golf & Country Club, Machynys

Geographical

Beaches
Cefn Sidan
Marros Sands
Pendine Sands

Rivers and waterways
afon lledi
Afon Cymin
Afon Cywyn
Afon Gwili
Afon Tâf
Afon Teifi
Afon Aman
Gwendraeth Fach
Gwendraeth Fawr
River Loughor
River Tywi
Usk Reservoir

Country parks and nature reserves
Brechfa Forest
Pembrey Country Park
WWT National Wetlands Centre

Transport

Cycle routes
Celtic Trail (NCR route 47)
Millennium Coastal Path

Major roads
M4 motorway
A48 road
A483 road

Railway lines
Amman Valley Railway
Heart of Wales Line
West Wales Line
Gwili Railway
Teifi Valley Railway

Railway stations
see :Category:Railway stations in Carmarthenshire

Airports
Pembrey Airport

Carmarthenshire